Nguyễn Bình An (28 January 1985) is a Vietnamese male paralympic powerlifter.

References

External links
IPC Profile
London 2012 Profile Binh An Nguyen

1985 births
Living people
Paralympic powerlifters of Vietnam